Dorothy Ann Todd (24 January 1907 – 6 May 1993) was an English film, television and stage actress who achieved international fame when she starred in 1945's The Seventh Veil. From 1949 to 1957 she was married to David Lean who directed her in 1949's The Passionate Friends, 1950's Madeleine and 1952's The Sound Barrier. She was a member of The Old Vic theatre company and in 1957 starred in a Broadway play. In her later years she wrote, produced and directed travel documentaries.

Early years 
Todd was born in Hartford, Cheshire. Although latterly claiming to be born in 1909, 1911 census records show her born in 1907 and christened in March 1907. Her Scottish-born father Thomas was a salesman, and her London-born mother Constance a housewife. She had a younger brother Harold Brooke (who took their mother's maiden name), who became a screenwriter of light comedies.

After the family moved to London, Todd was educated at St. Winifrid's School, Eastbourne, Sussex. She studied speech training and drama under Elsie Fogerty at the Central School of Speech and Drama, then based at the Royal Albert Hall, London, with the intention of becoming a drama teacher. But during her studies she made her stage debut as a fairy in "The Land of Heart's Desire" at the Arts Theatre Club in Soho, and decided instead to pursue a career in acting.

Film 
Initially a London-based theatre actress, she quickly began to accumulate walk-on parts in film, making her film debut in Keepers of Youth (1931). She had roles in These Charming People (1931), The Ghost Train (1931), The Water Gipsies (1932) and The Return of Bulldog Drummond (1934).

For Alex Korda, Todd was in Things to Come (1936), Action for Slander (1937), The Squeaker (1937), and South Riding (1938).

During World War II, Todd was in Poison Pen (1939), Danny Boy (1941), and Ships with Wings (1941). But she concentrated latterly again on theatre roles, putting in a memorable performance in Enid Bagnold's psychological thriller "Lottie Dundass" at the Vaudeville Theatre in 1943.

Stardom 
Todd returned to film post-WWII with a good support role in a big hit, Perfect Strangers (1945, as a nurse), then had a huge success when she played a suicidal concert pianist in The Seventh Veil (1945), opposite James Mason. She followed this with a musical, Gaiety George (1946) and a noir, Daybreak (shot in 1946, released in 1948).

The Seventh Veil was a hit in the US as well as UK. In 1946, having been signed by producer David O. Selznick, Todd was said to be the "holder of the most lucrative contract ever signed by an English cinema actress, with over a million dollars involved in its clauses." She commented in subsequent interviews that she continued to do her own grocery shopping, and latterly in her autobiography noted that she paid $880,000 in taxes on the contract.

She received a Hollywood offer from Alfred Hitchcock to play Gregory Peck's wife in The Paradine Case (1947), which was a flop. So Evil My Love (1948), a US-British co production, was a box office disappointment, as was The Passionate Friends (1949), directed by her then husband David Lean. Lean also directed Todd in Madeleine (1950) and The Sound Barrier (1952); the latter was successful commercially.

Todd appeared in some thrillers, The Green Scarf (1954) and Time Without Pity (1957). She had a good part in Hammer Films' Taste of Fear (1961).

Television 
Todd appeared in Ann and Harold (1938), the first British TV serial.  Todd starred in two episodes of Playhouse 90: "Not the Glory" and "The Grey Nurse Said Nothing". She also appeared in the title role of "Sylvia" on Alfred Hitchcock Presents (Season 3, episode 16) in 1958.

Stage 
In 1941 she appeared at St Martin's Theatre in Kenneth Horne's comedy Love in a Mist. In 1951 she reprised her film role in a stage version of The Seventh Veil in the West End. In 1957, post her divorce from David Lean, Todd made her Broadway-debut in the production of Four Winds.

Later career 
After co-starring in Ninety Degrees in the Shade in 1965, Todd effectively retired from acting, only returning throughout her life to roles to finance her new career producing a series of travel films. Her autobiography is titled The Eighth Veil, an allusion to the film which made her a star in Britain. Todd was known as the "pocket Garbo" for her diminutive, blonde beauty.

Personal life 
Todd said of herself, "I'm really very shy, and I get over that playing an actress."

Todd married three times. Her first husband, Victor N. Malcolm, was a grandson of Lillie Langtry; she had a son with him named David Malcolm. Her second and third husbands (Nigel Tangye and David Lean) were first cousins. She had a daughter with Nigel Tangye named Ann Francesca Tangye. She was divorced from Tangye 12 March 1949.

Todd married film director Lean on 21 May 1949 and starred successively in three of his films: The Passionate Friends (1949), Madeleine (1950) and The Sound Barrier (1952). Lean and Todd divorced 15 July 1957.

Death 
Todd died from a stroke at the Chelsea and Westminster Hospital on 6 May 1993, aged 86.

Partial filmography 

 These Charming People (1931) as Pamela Crawford
 The Ghost Train (1931) as Peggy Murdock
 Keepers of Youth (1931) as Millicent
 The Water Gipsies (1932) as Jane Bell
 The Return of Bulldog Drummond (1934) as Phyllis Drummond
 Things to Come (1936) as Mary Gordon
 Action for Slander (1937) as Ann Daviot
 The Squeaker (1937) as Carol Stedman
 South Riding (1938) as Midge Carne
 Ann and Harold (1938, TV Series) as Ann Teviot
 Poison Pen (1939) as Ann Rider
 Danny Boy (1941) as Jane Kaye
 Ships with Wings (1942) as Kay Gordon
 Perfect Strangers (1945) as Elena
 The Seventh Veil (1945) as Francesca
 Gaiety George (1946) as Kathryn Davis
 The Paradine Case (1947) as Gay Keane
 So Evil My Love (1948) as Olivia Harwood
 Daybreak (1948) as Frankie
 The Passionate Friends (1949) as Mary Justin
 Madeleine (1950) as Madeleine Smith
 The Sound Barrier (1952) as Susan Garthwaite
 BBC Sunday-Night Theatre (1952–1954, TV Series) as Grand Duchess Tatiana Petrovna / Princess Louise
 The Green Scarf (1954) as Solange Vauthier
 The Alcoa Hour (1955, TV Series) as Jane Cornish
 The United States Steel Hour (1955, TV Series) as Evelyn Holt
 Time Without Pity (1957) as Honor Stanford
 Climax! (1957, TV Series) as Jane Palmer
 General Electric Theater (1958, TV Series) as Cynthia Spence
 Alfred Hitchcock Presents (1958, TV Series) as Sylvia Leeds Kent
 Playhouse 90 (1958–1959, TV Series) as Laura Mills / Lady Diane Goodfellow
 Armchair Theatre (1958–1966, TV Series) as Lady Baynton / Marguerite Gautier
 The Offshore Island (1959, TV Movie) as Rachel Verney
 Taste of Fear (1961) as Jane Appleby
 Thriller (American TV series) (1961), as Sylvia Lawrence
 The Son of Captain Blood (1962) as Arabella Blood
 Ninety Degrees in the Shade (1965) as Mrs Kurka
 Thirty-Minute Theatre (1967, TV Series) as The Woman
 The Fiend (1972) as Birdy Wemys
 The Human Factor (1979) as Castle's mother
 Maelstrom (1985, TV Mini-Series) as Astrid Linderman
 Screen Two (1986, TV Series) as Mrs. Forbes-Duthie
 Maigret (1992, TV Series) as Mlle. Josette (final appearance)

Radio appearances

References

External links 

 
 performances listed in Theatre Archive University of Bristol
 
 

1907 births
1993 deaths
20th-century English actresses
Actresses from Cheshire
Alumni of the Royal Central School of Speech and Drama
English film actresses
English television actresses
People from Hartford, Cheshire
20th-century British businesspeople